The United States House Permanent Select Committee on Intelligence (HPSCI), also known as the House Intelligence Committee, is a committee of the United States House of Representatives, currently chaired by Mike Turner. It is the primary committee in the U.S. House of Representatives charged with the oversight of the United States Intelligence Community, though it does share some jurisdiction with other committees in the House, including the Armed Services Committee for some matters dealing with the Department of Defense and the various branches of the U.S. military.

The committee was preceded by the Select Committee on Intelligence between 1975 and 1977. House Resolution 658 established the permanent select committee, which gave it status equal to a standing committee on July 14, 1977.

Jurisdiction 

The committee oversees all or part of the following executive branch departments and agencies:

History 
Prior to establishing the permanent select committee in 1977, the House of Representatives established the "Select Committee on Intelligence", commonly referred to as the "Pike Committee", so named after its last chairman, Otis G. Pike of New York. The select committee had originally been established in February 1975 under the chairmanship of Congressman Lucien Nedzi of Michigan. Following Nedzi's resignation in June, the committee was reconstituted with Pike as chair, in July 1975, with its mandate expiring January 31, 1976. Under Pike's chairmanship, the committee investigated illegal activities by the Central Intelligence Agency (CIA) and the Federal Bureau of Investigation (FBI).

The final report of the Pike Committee was never officially published due to Congressional opposition. However, unauthorized versions of the draft final report were leaked to the press. CBS News reporter Daniel Schorr was called to testify before Congress, but refused to divulge his source. Major portions of the report were published by The Village Voice, and a full copy of the draft was published in England.

During the 1980s the HPSCI worked to acquire access to covert action notifications of the CIA, as well as to strengthen the role of the committee in intelligence agency funding. Under the Reagan administration, the HPSCI and United States Senate Select Committee on Intelligence (SSCI) worked with Director of Central Intelligence William J. Casey on what was known as the "Casey Accords". The accords required that covert action findings were to be accompanied by "scope papers" that included a risk/gain assessment of each such activity. However, the deal was not acceptable to the HPSCI, and after the Iran–Contra affair, more pressure was placed on strengthening the oversight of committees.

In 2017, the committee was tasked along with the SSCI to evaluate the degree of Russian interference in the 2016 US elections. The committee was also investigating allegations of wiretapping of Donald Trump, as well as ties between Russian officials and members of Trump's presidential campaign. The committee came under intense scrutiny in 2017 and 2018 due to allegations of partisanship and leaks of classified information by members and their staff. In March 2018, the investigation into Russian interference in the 2016 elections was abruptly ended by the committee's Republican members despite the assertion by Democratic members that the investigation was incomplete and had failed to gather pertinent information. Notably, House Intelligence Republicans released a draft of their investigatory report which contradicted some findings of the U.S. Intelligence Community and was written without the input of House Democrats. In March 2018, after further disagreements, Republican committee member Tom Rooney claimed that the committee had "lost all credibility" and had become "a political forum for people to leak information to drive the day's news." In July 2018, the chair of the committee, Representative Devin Nunes, accused the Department of Justice and FBI of obstructing the committee's Trump/Russia related investigation in the hope of a Democratic takeover of Congress later that year.

With the change of party leadership in the House in the 116th United States Congress, the committee launched a probe of Trump's finances and Russian ties in February 2019. In June 2019, in the course of hearings on the national security implications of climate change, the White House blocked the submission of a statement by the State Department's Bureau of Intelligence and Research Office of the Geographer and Global Issues, and the analyst who wrote the statement, Rod Schoonover, resigned.

Members, 118th Congress

Members, 117th Congress

Subcommittees

Chairs

Select Committee chairs
Lucien N. Nedzi (D), 1975
Otis G. Pike (D), 1975–1976

Permanent Select Committee chairs
Edward P. Boland (D), 1977–1985
Lee H. Hamilton (D), 1985–1987
Louis Stokes (D), 1987–1989
Anthony C. Beilenson (D), 1989–1991
David K. McCurdy (D), 1991–1993
Dan Glickman (D), 1993–1995
Larry Combest (R), 1995–1997
Porter Goss (R), 1997–2004
Pete Hoekstra (R), 2004–2007
Silvestre Reyes (D), 2007–2011
Mike Rogers (R), 2011–2015
Devin Nunes (R), 2015–2019
Adam Schiff (D), 2019–2023
Mike Turner (R), 2023-present

See also
 COINTELPRO
 Church Committee
 Family Jewels
 List of current United States House of Representatives committees
 Timeline of investigations into Trump and Russia (2019)
 United States President's Commission on CIA Activities within the United States
 United States Senate Select Committee on Intelligence

Notes

External links

 
 The Pike Committee Investigations and the CIA
 Congressional Directory: Main Page, Government Printing Office Online. Detailed listings of many aspects of previous memberships and sessions of Congress.
 Open Congress Wiki
 Pike Committee Reports
 The Pike Committee Investigations and the CIA 
 Are all leaks good? The Pike Committee Report, Kissinger, and the Distortion of Events
 Historical Dictionary of the Kurds: Pike Committee Report
 Covert Action and the Pike Committee: 1975–76

Intelligence
Reports of the United States government
Intelligence
1977 establishments in Washington, D.C.
Government agencies established in 1977
Organizations associated with Russian interference in the 2016 United States elections
Legislative intelligence oversight